Ed Parish Sanders  (April 18, 1937 – November 21, 2022) was an American New Testament scholar and a principal proponent of the "New Perspective on Paul". He was a major scholar in the scholarship on the historical Jesus and contributed to the view that Jesus was part of a renewal movement within Judaism. Sanders identified himself as a "liberal, modern, secularized Protestant" in his book Jesus and Judaism; fellow scholar John P. Meier called him a postliberal Protestant. He was Arts and Sciences Professor of Religion at Duke University, North Carolina from 1990 until his retirement in 2005.

Sanders was a Fellow of the British Academy. In 1966, he received a Doctor of Theology degree from Union Theological Seminary in New York City. In 1990, he received a Doctor of Letters degree from the University of Oxford and a Doctor of Theology degree from the University of Helsinki. He authored, co-authored, or edited 13 books and numerous articles. He received a number of prizes, including the 1990 University of Louisville and Louisville Presbyterian Theological Seminary Grawemeyer Award for the best book on religion, Jesus and Judaism (Fortress Press, 1985).

Biography 
Sanders was born on April 18, 1937, in Grand Prairie, Texas. He attended Texas Wesleyan College (1955–1959) and Perkins School of Theology at Southern Methodist University (1959–1962). He spent a year (1962–1963) studying at Göttingen, the University of Oxford, and in Jerusalem.

Between September 1963 and May 1966, Sanders studied at Union Theological Seminary, New York City, for his Doctor of Theology degree. His thesis was titled The Tendencies of the Synoptic Tradition (published in 1969 by Cambridge University Press; reprinted by Wipf & Stock in 2000), which used form criticism to examine whether the Gospel tradition changed in consistent ways. The thesis was supervised by W. D. Davies.

Sanders taught at McMaster University (Hamilton, Ontario) from 1966 to 1984. In 1968 he won a fellowship from the Canada Council and spent a year in Israel, studying Rabbinic Judaism.

In 1984, he became Dean Ireland's Professor of the Exegesis of Holy Scripture at the University of Oxford and a Fellow of Queen's College, positions he kept until his move to Duke University in 1990. He also held visiting professorships and lectureships at Trinity College, Dublin, and the University of Cambridge. Sanders identified himself as a "liberal, modern, secularized Protestant" in his book Jesus and Judaism; fellow scholar John P. Meier called him a postliberal Protestant. In any case, he was cognizant of Albert Schweitzer's indictment of liberal theology's attempt to make Jesus in its own image, and sought to keep his religious convictions out of his scholarship.

Thought and writings 
Sanders was known for his New Testament scholarship. His field of special interest was Judaism and Christianity in the Greco-Roman world. He was one of the leading scholars in contemporary historical Jesus research, the so-called "Third Quest," which places Jesus firmly in the context of Judaism. In contemporary scholarship, Jesus is seen as the founder of a "renewal movement within Judaism," to use Sanders' phrase. He promotes the  predominant view that Jesus was an apocalyptic prophet.

Sanders' first major book was Paul and Palestinian Judaism, which was published in 1977. He had written the book by 1975, but had difficulty in having it published.

Sanders argued that the traditional Christian interpretation that Paul was condemning Rabbinic legalism was a misunderstanding of both Judaism and Paul's thought, especially since it assumed a level of individualism in these doctrines that was not present, and disregarded notions of group benefit or collective privilege. Rather, Sanders argued, the key difference between pre-Christian Judaism and Pauline teaching was to be found in ideas of how a person becomes one of the People of God. Sanders termed the Jewish belief "covenantal nomism": one was a member of the people by virtue of God's covenant with Abraham, and one stayed in it by keeping the Law.

Sanders claimed that Paul's belief was one of participationist eschatology: the only way to become one of the People of God was through faith in Christ ("dying with Christ") and the Old Covenant was no longer sufficient. But, once inside, appropriate behavior was required of the Christian, behavior based on the Jewish Scriptures, but not embracing all aspects of it. Both patterns required the grace of God for election (admission), and the behavior of the individual, supported by God's grace. The dividing line, therefore, was Paul's insistence on faith in Christ as the only way to election. However, Sanders stressed that Paul also "loved good deeds"  and that when his words are taken in context, it emerges that Paul advocates good works in addition to faith in Christ.

Sanders' next major book was Jesus and Judaism, published in 1985. In this work he argued that Jesus began as a follower of John the Baptist and was a prophet of the restoration of Israel. Sanders saw Jesus as creating an eschatological Jewish movement through his appointment of the Apostles and through his preaching and actions. After his execution (the trigger for which was Jesus overthrowing the tables in the temple court of Herod's Temple, thereby antagonizing the political authorities) his followers continued the movement, expecting his return to restore Israel. One consequence of this return would involve Gentiles worshiping the God of Israel. Sanders could find no substantial points of opposition between Jesus and the Pharisees, and he viewed Jesus as abiding by Jewish law and the disciples as continuing to keep it (cf. e.g., Acts 3:1; 21:23–26, for their worship in the Temple). Sanders also argued that Jesus' sayings did not entirely determine Early Christian behavior and attitudes, as is shown by Paul's discussion of divorce (1 Cor. 7:10–16) where the latter quotes Jesus' sayings and then gives his own independent ruling. In one interview, Sanders stated that Paul felt that "he was the model to his churches."

Judaism: Practice and Belief was published in 1992 and tested Sanders' thesis in the light of concrete Jewish practices. Sanders argued that there was a "Common Judaism", that is, beliefs and practices common to all Jews, regardless of which religious party they belonged to. After the reign of Salome Alexandra, the Pharisees were a small but very respected party which had a varying amount of influence within Judaism. The main source of power, however, was with the rulers and especially the aristocratic priesthood (Sadducees). Sanders argued that the evidence indicates that the Pharisees did not dictate policy to any of these groups or individuals.

In general, Sanders stressed the importance of historical context for a proper understanding of first century religion. He attempted to approach Judaism on its own terms, not in the context of the Protestant–Catholic debates of the sixteenth century in order to redefine views on Judaism, Paul, and Christianity as a whole. As Sanders said, he read Paul in his context, which is "Palestine in the first century and especially first century Judaism."  In this spirit, one of Sanders' articles is titled "Jesus in Historical Context". In a 2000 encyclopedia entry on Jesus, whom Sanders called an 'eschatological prophet', the subject avoids the word 'angel' although mention is made of the two men 'in dazzling clothes' at the empty tomb.

Sanders argued that more comparative studies are needed, with wider examinations conducted between New Testament texts and the other available historical sources of the period. Speaking at a conference organized in his honor, he described the attractiveness of these types of comparative studies: "They are not all that easy, but they are an awful lot of fun."

Sanders died on November 21, 2022, at the age of 85.

Selected works

Books

Articles and chapters

Festschrift

References

Further reading

External links 
E. P. Sanders, "Intellectual Autobiography"
E. P. Sanders, "Jesus in Historical Context"
E. P. Sanders, "The Question of Uniqueness in the Teaching of Jesus" 
The New Perspective on Paul

1937 births
2022 deaths
People from Grand Prairie, Texas
Grand Prairie High School alumni
Academics from Texas
20th-century American theologians
American biblical scholars
Critics of the Christ myth theory
New Testament scholars
Jewish–Christian debate
Union Theological Seminary (New York City) alumni
Southern Methodist University alumni
Academics of the University of Oxford
Academic staff of McMaster University
Duke University faculty
Fellows of The Queen's College, Oxford
Fellows of the British Academy
Fellows of the American Academy of Arts and Sciences
Dean Ireland's Professors of the Exegesis of Holy Scripture
21st-century American theologians
American Protestants